Nisbet could refer to:

People
Nisbet (surname)

Places

Canada
Nisbet Provincial Forest

United Kingdom
Nisbet, Scottish Borders
Nisbet, East Lothian
Nisbet, Roxburghshire
Nisbet, South Lanarkshire
Nisbet House, Berwickshire

United States
Nisbet, Indiana
Nisbet, Pennsylvania

See also
Nisbett (disambiguation)
Nesbit (disambiguation)
Nesbitt (disambiguation)
Clan Nesbitt